Edward Virgil Abner (sometimes billed as E. Virgil Abner or simply Virgil Abner; 1925–1984) was an American singer of the mid 20th century, primarily active in the 1950s and 1960s.

Abner studied at the Chicago Musical College, and in 1950 was the winner of the Chicago Music Association scholarship.

In 1949, Abner was the choral director of a 40-person gospel choir that performed a number of spirituals on Chicago's WMOR radio station.

In 1951, he led a vocal ensemble called the Knights of Music, which featured Alton Abraham, who would go on to become Sun Ra's collaborator and business manager. The group performed a wide range of compositions in many different genres, from Bach and Handel to theatre songs by Rodgers and Hammerstein to spiritual music and even pop songs. The group would on occasion feature as guest accompanist a young Ramsey Lewis. In 1953, Abner performed at the convention of the National Association of Negro Musicians, presided over by blues composer W.C. Handy.

Throughout the 1950s and 1960s however, Virgil was more known for his work in the opera genre. In 1953, he became the director of the Chicago Opera Group. He sang in lead roles in Aida at the St. Louis Opera Company. He played the role of the messenger in Il trovatore and Giuseppi in La traviata in the Lyric Opera of Chicago's 1956 season. In 1960, Abner performed as a soloist with the North Side Symphony Orchestra of Chicago. And in 1962, Abner was the soloist in Ludwig van Beethoven's Missa solemnis at Milton College.

Abner died in 1984 at the age of 59.

References

1925 births
1984 deaths
Singers from Chicago
African-American male opera singers
20th-century American male opera singers
20th-century African-American male singers
Classical musicians from Illinois
Chicago Musical College alumni